Henry, Earl of Lancaster may refer to:

Henry, 3rd Earl of Lancaster from 1322 to 1345
Henry of Grosmont, 1st Duke of Lancaster, Earl from 1345 to 1351